Menthyl anthranilate (meradimate) is a sunscreening agent.  It is one of the 17 ingredients approved by the Food and Drug Administration for use in over-the-counter sunscreen products.

References

Anthranilates
Cyclohexanols
Sunscreening agents